Saint-Donat-sur-l'Herbasse (Vivaro-Alpine: Sant Donat) is a commune in the Drôme department in southeastern France. The writer and literary prizes winner Isabelle Hausser was born in Saint-Donat.

Population

Twin towns — sister cities
Saint-Donat-sur-l'Herbasse is twinned with:

  Oulx, Italy (1988)
  Ottobeuren, Germany (1994)

See also
Communes of the Drôme department

References

Communes of Drôme